Emily Westwood (born 4 August 1993) is a badminton player from England.

Achievements

BWF International Challenge/Series 
Women's doubles

Mixed doubles

  BWF International Challenge tournament
  BWF International Series tournament
  BWF Future Series tournament

References

External links 
 

1993 births
Living people
Sportspeople from Hemel Hempstead
English female badminton players